Siwkowo  (German: Heinrichshof) is a settlement in the administrative district of Gmina Stargard, within Stargard County, West Pomeranian Voivodeship, in north-western Poland.

References

Siwkowo